Timothy Michael Ray is a retired United States Air Force general who last served as the commander of Air Force Global Strike Command from August 21, 2018, to August 27, 2021. He concurrently served as the commander of Air Forces Strategic – Air, United States Strategic Command. His two previous assignments were as the Deputy Commander, United States European Command, and as the Commander, Third Air Force. He previously served as the director of global power programs in the Office of the Assistant Secretary of the Air Force for Acquisition, Headquarters United States Air Force, Washington, D.C.

Military career
Ray is a native of DeLand, Florida. In February 2018, he was nominated for promotion to general and reassignment as the commander of the Air Force Global Strike Command. This nomination was confirmed by the United States Senate in March 2018. Prior to his current assignment, Ray served as the Deputy Commander, United States European Command in Stuttgart, Germany.

His retirement ceremony was held on July 1, 2021, but it took until August of the same year before his deputy, Lieutenant General Anthony J. Cotton officially relieved him as commander of Air Force Global Strike Command. Ray officially retired from the USAF on September 1, 2021.

Education
 1985 Bachelor of Science degree in Human Factors Engineering, U.S. Air Force Academy, Colorado Springs, Colo.
 1994 Distinguished graduate, Squadron Officer School, Maxwell AFB, Ala.
 1998 Master of Science degree in aviation sciences and management, Embry-Riddle Aeronautical University, Daytona Beach, Fla.
 1998 Distinguished graduate, Air Command and Staff College, Maxwell AFB, Ala.
 2004 Master of Science degree in strategic studies, Air War College, Maxwell AFB, Ala.
 2008 Senior Executive Fellow, Harvard University, Cambridge, Mass.

Assignments
1. August 1985 – August 1987, student, undergraduate pilot training, Williams AFB, Ariz.
2. August 1987 – October 1987, student, B-52 combat crew training, Castle AFB, Calif.
3. November 1987 – March 1993, B-52 flight commander, instructor and evaluator pilot, 23rd Bomb Squadron, Minot AFB, N.D.
4. March 1993 – March 1994, B-52 Flying Training Unit instructor pilot, Castle AFB, Calif.
5. March 1994 – June 1997, B-52 FTU instructor pilot and executive officer, 2nd Bomb Wing, Barksdale AFB, La.
6. June 1997 – July 1998, student, Air Command and Staff College, Maxwell AFB, Ala.
7. July 1998 – October 2000, Deputy Chief, Aircraft Team, U.S. Strategic Command, Offutt AFB, Neb.
8. October 2000 – June 2001, operations officer, 11th Bomb Squadron, Barksdale AFB, La.
9. June 2001 – July 2003, Commander, 96th Bomb Squadron, Barksdale AFB, La.
10. August 2003 – June 2004, student, Air War College, Maxwell AFB, Ala.
11. July 2004 – September 2005, Chief, Training, Readiness, Exercises and NEO Division (J37), U.S. Forces Korea, Yongsan Army Garrison, South Korea
12. September 2005 – July 2006, Vice Commander, 5th Bomb Wing, Minot AFB, N.D.
13. July 2006 – June 2008, Commander, 7th Bomb Wing, Dyess AFB, Texas
14. July 2008 – July 2009, deputy director of Air and Space Operations at Air Combat Command, Langley AFB, Va.
15. August 2009 – August 2011, Director of Operations, Air Force Global Strike Command, Barksdale AFB, La.
16. August 2011 – September 2012, Commanding General, NATO Air Training Command – Afghanistan, NATO Training Mission – Afghanistan/Combined Security Transition Command – Afghanistan and Commander, 438th Air Expeditionary Wing, Kabul, Afghanistan
17. September 2012 – January 2014, Director, Operational Planning, Policy and Strategy, Deputy Chief of Staff, Operations, Plans and Requirements, Headquarters U.S. Air Force, the Pentagon, Arlington, Va.
18. February 2014 – June 2015, Director, Global Power Programs, Office of the Assistant Secretary of the Air Force for Acquisition, Headquarters U.S. Air Force, the Pentagon, Arlington, Va.
19. July 2015 – October 2016, Commander, 3rd Air Force, Ramstein Air Base, Germany
20. November 2016 – August 2018, Deputy Commander, U.S. European Command, Stuttgart, Germany
21. August 2018 – August 2021, Commander, Air Force Global Strike Command, and Commander, Air Forces Strategic – Air, U.S. Strategic Command, Barksdale AFB, La.

Flight information
Rating: Command Pilot.
Flight hours: more than 4,000.
Aircraft flown: T-37, T-38, B-52G, B-52H, B-1B, C-21, C-27A and C-208.

Awards and decorations

Effective dates of promotion

References

External links

Air War College alumni
United States Air Force personnel of the Iraq War
United States Air Force personnel of the War in Afghanistan (2001–2021)
Embry–Riddle Aeronautical University alumni
Living people
Military personnel from Florida
People from DeLand, Florida
Recipients of the Air Force Distinguished Service Medal
Recipients of the Air Medal
Recipients of the Defense Superior Service Medal
Recipients of the Legion of Merit
United States Air Force Academy alumni
United States Air Force generals
Year of birth missing (living people)